Hans du Plessis is a South African rugby league player for the Tuks Bulls. His position is centre. He is a South African international, and has played in the 2013 Rugby League World Cup qualifying against Jamaica and the USA.

References

du Plessis, Hans
du Plessis, Hans
Tuks Bulls players
Rugby league centres